Gazeley is a village and civil parish in the West Suffolk district of Suffolk in eastern England and is part of the West Suffolk UK Parliament constituency. In 2005 it had a population of 740. A house converted from a windmill survives in the village. The surnames of Gazeley, Gazley and Gazlay derive from this source.

The name Gazeley means "Woodland clearing of a man called *Gǣgi".

The Icknield Way Path passes through the village on its 110-mile journey from Ivinghoe Beacon in Buckinghamshire to Knettishall Heath in Suffolk. The Icknield Way Trail, a multi-user route for walkers, horse riders and off-road cyclists also passes through the village.

Notable people
Bill Norman, football manager

See also
Desning Hall

References

External links

All Saints', Gazeley Suffolk Churches

Gazeley
Villages in Suffolk
Civil parishes in Suffolk
Forest Heath